Eutaw Springs Battleground Park is a historic site located near Eutawville, Orangeburg County, South Carolina. It was the site of the American Revolutionary War Battle of Eutaw Springs.  The battle occurred on September 8, 1781, and was the last major engagement of the war in the Carolinas.  The site includes a historic marker and the tomb of British Commander Major John Marjoribanks.

It was added to the National Register of Historic Places in 1970.

References

External links

 Eutaw Springs Battleground Park – Eutawville, South Carolina

Monuments and memorials on the National Register of Historic Places in South Carolina
South Carolina in the American Revolution
Buildings and structures in Orangeburg County, South Carolina
National Register of Historic Places in Orangeburg County, South Carolina
Protected areas of Orangeburg County, South Carolina
Parks in South Carolina
American Revolutionary War sites
Battlefields in the United States
American Revolution on the National Register of Historic Places
Conflict sites on the National Register of Historic Places in South Carolina